Karkar Morghi Deli Bajak (also Romanized as Karkar Morghī Delī Bajak) is a village in Chenar Rural District, Kabgian District, Dana County, Kohgiluyeh and Boyer-Ahmad Province, Iran. At the 2006 census, its population was 18, in 4 families.

References 

Populated places in Dana County